Dion Digby Ebrahim (born 7 August 1980) is a former Zimbabwean cricketer, who played Tests and ODIs. He now lives in New Zealand where he works as a cricket coach.

International career
A graduate of the CFX Academy in Harare, Ebrahim was considered an integral part of Zimbabwean cricket until falling out of favour with authorities.

Ebrahim has a highest One Day International score of 121 and highest Test score of 94.

Domestic career
Since leaving Zimbabwe in 2005, he has played in England as the captain of Stony Stratford CC who play in the Northants Premier Division. He also played in New Zealand for the Hawera United Cricket Club and Taranaki in the Hawke Cup. He holds the record for the number of Hawke Cup centuries for Taranaki.

In 2009, he was contracted by Zimbabwean franchise side Matabeleland Tuskers. He appeared for the Tuskers and thus he made himself available for national selection again.

In mid-2011, he played for Shenley village in the Hertfordshire League in England. He spent the 2011/12 and the 2012/13 summers playing in Taranaki, New Zealand.

He has coached at almost all levels of cricket in New Zealand, from schools to provincial and national age group levels. In June 2021 he was appointed coach of Otago.

Arrest
Dion was arrested for using a Zimbabwe Cricket sponsored car after the ZC board did not offer him a new contract. Dion's lawyer told the police that ZC did not pay Dion his outstanding match fees. It was revealed that Tatenda Taibu was also involved in the case. ZC owed both Dion and Tatenda $200,000 each in backpay. Tatenda told Associated Press that he would not give back the car until he had match fee outstandings paid to him fully. But the ZC Board said that the Ebrahim's payment is separate to the continued use of the ZC registered car. The problem remains unsolved.

Personal life
Ebrahim is married to New Zealand international cricketer Kate Ebrahim.

References

External links
 http://www.cricinfo.com/zimbabwe/content/story/431122.html
 http://www.cricinfo.com/zimbabwe/content/story/421905.html
 http://www.taranakicricket.co.nz/senior/news.asp?area=2
 http://content-aus.cricinfo.com/zimbabwe/content/story/237519.html
 http://content-usa.cricinfo.com/zimbabwe/content/player/55416.html
 http://content-usa.cricinfo.com/zimbabwe/content/story/237203.html

1980 births
Living people
Cricketers from Bulawayo
Alumni of Falcon College
CFX Academy cricketers
Cricketers at the 2003 Cricket World Cup
Manicaland cricketers
Mashonaland cricketers
Matabeleland cricketers
Zimbabwe One Day International cricketers
Zimbabwe Test cricketers
Zimbabwean cricketers
Zimbabwean cricket coaches
Zimbabwean people of Indian descent
Zimbabwean emigrants to New Zealand